NGC 688 is a barred spiral galaxy with starburst activity located 190 million light-years away in the constellation Triangulum. It was discovered by astronomer Heinrich d'Arrest on September 16, 1865 and is a member of the galaxy cluster Abell 262.

See also
 List of NGC objects (1–1000)

References

External links

688
1302
6799
Triangulum (constellation)
Astronomical objects discovered in 1865
Barred spiral galaxies
Abell 262
Starburst galaxies